Tonna tankervillii is a very large species of sea snail or tun snail, a marine gastropod mollusc in the family Tonnidae, the tun shells.

Distribution
This species is found in Australia, from Torres Strait in the north, down the east coast, and also on the northeast coast of New Zealand.

Shell description
The shell height is up to 23 cm, and width 19 cm.

References

External links 
 ZipCodeZoo

Tonnidae
Gastropods described in 1860
Taxa named by Sylvanus Charles Thorp Hanley